Perling is a state constituency in Johor, Malaysia, that has been represented in the Johor State Legislative Assembly since 2018.

The state constituency was created in the 2018 redistribution and is mandated to return a single member to the Johor State Legislative Assembly under the first past the post voting system.

History

Polling districts 
According to the gazette issued on 30 March 2018, the Perling constituency has a total of 26 polling districts.

Representation history

Election results

References 

 

Johor state constituencies